Mine, mines, miners or mining may refer to:

Extraction or digging
Miner, a person engaged in mining or digging
Mining, extraction of mineral resources from the ground through a mine

Grammar
Mine, a first-person English possessive pronoun

Military
 Anti-tank mine, a land mine made for use against armored vehicles
 Antipersonnel mine, a land mine targeting people walking around, either with explosives or poison gas
 Bangalore mine, colloquial name for the Bangalore torpedo, a man-portable explosive device for clearing a path through wire obstacles and land mines
 Cluster bomb, an aerial bomb which releases many small submunitions, which often act as mines
 Land mine, explosive mines placed under or on the ground
 Mining (military), digging under a fortified military position to penetrate its defenses
 Naval mine, or sea mine, a mine at sea, either floating or on the sea bed, often dropped via parachute from aircraft, or otherwise lain by surface ships or submarines
 Parachute mine, an air-dropped "sea mine" falling gently under a parachute, used as a high-capacity cheaply-cased large bomb against ground targets

Places
 The Mine, Queensland, a locality in the Rockhampton Region, Australia
Mine, Saga, a Japanese town
Mine, Yamaguchi, a Japanese city
Mine District, Yamaguchi, a former district in the area of the city

People

Given name
Mine Ercan (born 1978), Turkish women's wheelchair basketball player
Mine Guri, Albanian communist politician
Miné Okubo (1912–2001), American artist and writer

Nickname
Mine Boy, nickname of Alex Levinsky (1910–1990), NHL hockey player

Surname
Kazuki Mine (born 1993), Japanese football player
George Ralph Mines (born 1886), English cardiac electrophysiologist

Arts, entertainment, and media

Films
Mine (1985 film), a Turkish film
Mine (2009 film), an American documentary film
Mine (2016 film), an Italian-American film
Abandoned Mine or The Mine, a 2013 horror film
The Mine (1978 film), Turkish film

Literature
Mine (novel), a 1990 novel by Robert R. McCammon
The Mine (novel), 2012 novel by Arnab Ray

Music

Albums
Mine (Kim Jaejoong EP), 2013
Mine (Dolly Parton album), 1973
Mine (Phoebe Ryan EP), 2015
Mine (Li Yuchun album), 2007
Mines (album), a 2010 album by indie rock band Menomena
Mine!, a 1994 album released by musical duo Trout Fishing in America

Songs
"Mine" (Alice Glass song), 2018
"Mine" (Bazzi song), 2017
"Mine" (Beyoncé song), 2013
"Mine" (Taylor Swift song), 2010
"Mine" (The 1975 song), 2018
"Mine", a song from the 1933 Broadway musical Let 'Em Eat Cake
"Mine", a song by Bebe Rexha from the album Expectations
"Mine", a song by Dolly Parton from In the Good Old Days (When Times Were Bad)
"Mine", a song by Everything but the Girl from Everything but the Girl
"Mine", a song by Ghinzu from Blow
"Mine", a song by Jason Webley from Only Just Beginning
"Mine", a song by Krezip from Days Like This
"Mine", a song by Mustasch from Mustasch
"Mine", a song by Savage Garden from Savage Garden
"Mine", a song by Sepultura from Roots
"Mine", a song by Taproot from Welcome
"Mine", a song by Christina Perri from lovestrong
"Mine", a song by Disturbed from The Lost Children
"Mine", a song by M.I from the album The Chairman
"#Mine", a song by Lil' Kim from Lil Kim Season
"Mine, Mine, Mine", a song from the soundtrack for the 1995 Disney film Pocahontas

Television
  Mine (2021 TV series), a South Korean television series

Organizations and enterprises
MINE, a design office in San Francisco, US, of which Christopher Simmons is principal creative director
Colorado School of Mines or "Mines", a university in Golden, Colorado, US
Mine's, a Japanese auto tuning company
South Dakota School of Mines and Technology, a university in Rapid City, South Dakota, US

Science and technology
MINE (chemotherapy), a chemotherapy regimen
Mine or star mine, a type of fireworks
MinE, a bacterial protein
Data mining, the computational process of discovering patterns in large data sets
Leaf mine, a space in a leaf
Mina (unit), or mine, an ancient Greek unit of mass

See also
 Mein (disambiguation)
Mining (disambiguation)
Yours (disambiguation)